Ernie Barker (6 March 1913 – 14 February 1996) was an Australian equestrian. He competed in two events at the 1956 Summer Olympics.

References

External links
 

1913 births
1996 deaths
Australian male equestrians
Olympic equestrians of Australia
Equestrians at the 1956 Summer Olympics
Sportspeople from Melbourne
20th-century Australian people
People from Oakleigh, Victoria
Sportsmen from Victoria (Australia)